Lepisosteus is a genus of gars in the family Lepisosteidae.

Distribution 
While in the present day, Lepisosteus is only known across North America, fossil remains show it was much more widespread in the past, with specimens known from the Cretaceous of India and Brazil.

Systematics

Species
The currently recognized species are:

Extant species

Fossil species 
 †Lepisosteus aganus (Cope, 1877)
 †Lepisosteus bemisi Grande, 2010
 †Lepisosteus bohemicus (Laube, 1901)
 †Lepisosteus cominatoi Santos, 1984
 †Lepisosteus cycliferus (Cope, 1873)
 †Lepisosteus glaber Marsh, 1871
 †Lepisosteus indicus Woodward, 1908
 †Lepisosteus integer (Cope, 1877)
 †Lepisosteus fimbriatus Wood, 1846
 †Lepisosteus knieskerni Fowler, 1911
 †Lepisosteus longus Lambe, 1908
 †Lepisosteus nahunticus (Cope, 1869)
 †Lepisosteus notabilis Leidy, 1873
 †Lepisosteus occidentalis
 †Lepisosteus opertus Estes, 1964
 †Lepisosteus strausi Kinkelin, 1884
 †Lepisosteus suessoniensis Gervais, 1888
 †Lepisosteus whitneyi Marsh, 1871

Three species formerly classified in Lepisosteus (tropical gar, Cuban gar, and alligator gar) are now assigned to the genus Atractosteus.

References

External links 
 
 

Lepisosteidae
Milk River Formation
Extant Albian first appearances